Lesticus busuangae is a species of ground beetle in the subfamily Pterostichinae. It was described by Heller in 1923.

References

Lesticus
Beetles described in 1923